Stathis Rokas (born 18 September 1984) is a Greek former professional footballer.

Career
Rokas began his professional playing career by signing with Atromitos in May 2002. He would play for Ionikos, Vyzas and Thrasyvoulos before joining Asteras Tripoli in January 2009.

References

External links
Profile at Sport.gr
Guardian Football

1984 births
Living people
Greece under-21 international footballers
Atromitos F.C. players
Ionikos F.C. players
Vyzas F.C. players
Thrasyvoulos F.C. players
Asteras Tripolis F.C. players
Panionios F.C. players
Panachaiki F.C. players
Olympiacos Volos F.C. players
Super League Greece players
Association football midfielders
Footballers from Athens
Greek footballers